The 1932 Jacksonville State Eagle Owls football team represented Jacksonville State Teachers College (now known as Jacksonville State University) as an independent during the 1932 college football season. Led by second-year head coach T. B. Shotts, the Eagle Owls compiled an overall record of 3–1–1.

Schedule

References

Jacksonville State
Jacksonville State Gamecocks football seasons
Jacksonville State Eagle Owls football